David Roberts is an Australian actor who has appeared in television, film and theatre.

Television
 Phoenix (1992) – Detective Robert Howie
 Law of the Land (1993) – Peter Lawrence
 Mercury (1996) – Dave 'Gibbo' Gibson
 Water Rats (1998) – Barry Strong (2 episodes)
Halifax f.p. (2000)
 The Lost World (2002) – Mordren
 Out There (2003) – Jonathan Archer
 Blue Heelers (2003) – Peter Ball
 Holly's Heroes (2005) – Alan Peterson
 Small Claims (2005) – Peter Hindmarsh
 Home and Away (2009) – Lou DeBono
 Underbelly: A Tale of Two Cities (2009) – Angus Campbell
 Rescue: Special Ops (2009) – Ed Frazer
 City Homicide (2009) – Max McKenzie
 The Jesters (2009) – Andrew Shrapton
 Underbelly: Razor (2011) – Frank de Groot
 Please Like Me (2013-2016) – Alan (Dad)
Offspring (2007-2011) – Phil D'Arabont

Film
 The Matrix Reloaded (2003) – Roland
 The Matrix Revolutions (2003) – Roland
 Gettin' Square (2003) – Niall Toole
 A Divided Heart (2005) – Charles Vickery
 Three Dollars (2005) – Gerard
 Fool's Gold (2008) – Cyrus
 Ghost Rider (2007) – Captain Dolan
 The Square (2008) – Raymond Yale
 The Landing – Adult Edward
 Occupation: Rainfall (2020) – Abraham

Music video
 Embracing Me (2015) by SAFIA

External links

Australian male film actors
Australian male soap opera actors
Australian male stage actors
Living people
20th-century Australian male actors
21st-century Australian male actors
Year of birth missing (living people)